Belgium competed at the 1972 Summer Olympics in Munich, West Germany. 88 competitors, 82 men and 6 women, took part in 51 events in 14 sports.

Medalists
Belgium finished in 29th position in the final medal rankings, with two silver medals.

Silver
 Emiel Puttemans — Athletics, Men's 10,000 metres
 Karel Lismont — Athletics, Men's Marathon

Archery

In the first modern archery competition at the Olympics, Belgium entered three men. Their highest placing competitor was Robert Cogniaux, who missed a medal by 22 points.

Men's Individual Competition:
 Robert Cogniaux — 2445 points (4th place)
 Andre Baeyens — 2383 points (18th place)
 Jos Daman — 2365 points (23rd place)

Athletics

Men's 800 metres
Herman Mignon
 Heat — 1:47.5
 Semifinals — 1:49.7 (→ did not advance)

Men's 1500 metres
Herman Mignon
 Heat — 3:44.2
 Semifinals — 3:41.7
 Final — 3:39.1 (→ 6th place)
Edgard Salvé
 Heat — 3:42.1 (→ did not advance)
André de Hertoghe
 Heat — 3:44.6 (→ did not advance)

Men's 5000 metres
Willy Polleunis
 Heat — 13:52.6 (→ did not advance)
René Goris
 Heat — 13:57.8 (→ did not advance)

Canoeing

Cycling

Fourteen cyclists represented Belgium in 1972.

Individual road race
 Freddy Maertens — 13th place
 Gustaaf Hermans — 45th place
 Lucien De Brauwere — 59th place
 Frans Van Looy — did not finish (→ no ranking)

Team time trial
 Ludo Delcroix
 Gustaaf Hermans
 Gustaaf Van Cauter
 Louis Verreydt

Sprint
 Robert Maveau
 Manu Snellinx

1000m time trial
 Robert Maveau
 Final — 1:08.94 (→ 14th place)

Tandem
 Manu Snellinx and Noël Soetaert → 5th place

Individual pursuit
 Wilfried Wesemael

Individual pursuit
 Leon Daelemans
 Roger De Beukelaer
 Alex Van Linden
 Wilfried Wesemael

Equestrian

Fencing

One female fencer represented Belgium in 1972.

Women's foil
 Claudine le Comte

Hockey

Men's Team Competition
Preliminary Round (Group A)
 Lost to West Germany (1-5)
 Drew with Argentina (1-1)
 Defeated France (1-0)
 Lost to Spain (0-1)
 Lost to Malaysia (2-4)
 Defeated Uganda (2-0)
 Lost to Pakistan (1-3)
Classification Match
 9th/10th place: Lost to New Zealand (1-2) → 10th place
Team Roster
Armand Solie  
Carl-Eric Vanderborght 
Charly Bouvy  
Daniel Dupont 
Eric Stoupel  
Guy Miserque  
Jean Toussaint  
Jean-André Zembsch 
Jean-Claude Moraux 
Jean-François Gilles 
Jean-Marie Buisset 
Marc Legros  
Michel De Saedeleer  
Michel Deville 
Patrick Gillard  
Philippe Collin 
Raoul Ronsmans

Judo

Rowing

Men's Coxed Pairs
Paul De Weert, Wilfried Van Herck and Guy Defraigne
Heat — 8:08.51
Repechage — 8:16.26 (→ did not advance)

Sailing

Jacques Rogge - Finn Class 14th place.

Shooting

Six male shooters represented Belgium in 1972.

50 m pistol
 André Zoltan

50 m rifle, three positions
 Frans Lafortune

50 m rifle, prone
 Frans Lafortune
 Robert Houman

Trap
 Guy Rénard

Skeet
 Francis Cornet
 Chris Binet

Swimming

Weightlifting

Wrestling

References

External links
Official Olympic Reports
International Olympic Committee results database

Nations at the 1972 Summer Olympics
1972 Summer Olympics
Olympics